The Ministry of Instrument-Making, Automation Devices and Control Systems (Minpribor) was a government ministry in the Soviet Union.

Established in 1959 as State Committee for Automation and Machine Building; it assumed its ministerial title in 1965; oversees development and integration into industry of automated control systems. The ministry developed and manufactured systems for industrial control, planning and management.

List of ministers
Source:
 Konstantin Rudnev (2.10.1965 - 19.4.1979)
 Anatoli Kostousov (26.7.1974 - 19.4.1979)
 Konstantin Rudnev (19.4.1979 - 1.7.1980)
 Mikhail Shkabardnya (10.9.1980 - 17.7.1989)

References